John Ball (20 August 1818 – 21 October 1889) was an Irish politician, naturalist and Alpine traveller.

Background and education
Ball was born in Dublin, the eldest son of Nicholas Ball,  judge of the Court of Common Pleas (Ireland) and his wife Jane Sherlock. He was educated at Oscott College near Birmingham, and at Christ's College, Cambridge, where he was 41st Wrangler but as a Roman Catholic could not be admitted to a BA degree. He showed in his early years a taste for natural science, particularly botany; and after leaving Cambridge he travelled in Switzerland and elsewhere in Europe and North Africa, studying his favourite pursuits, and contributing papers on botany and the Swiss glaciers to scientific periodicals.

Political career
In 1846 Ball was made an assistant poor-law commissioner, but resigned in 1847, and in 1848 stood unsuccessfully as a parliamentary candidate for Sligo. In 1849 he was appointed second poor-law commissioner, but resigned in 1852 and successfully contested the Carlow County constituency in the Liberal interest. In 1854, while grave doubts were raised in well-informed quarters about entering a war with Russia, the voice of the people found expression in Ball who assured the government that justification of the Crimean war was vast, high and noble: 'the maintenance in civilised society of the principles of right and justice'. In the British House of Commons he attracted Lord Palmerston's attention by his abilities, and in 1855 was made Under-Secretary of State for the Colonies, a post which he held for two years.

At the colonial office he had great influence in furthering the cause of natural science, particularly in connection with equipment of the Palliser Expedition in Canada (for his efforts, the Ball Range in the Canadian Rockies was named after him), and with William Jackson Hooker's efforts to obtain a systematic knowledge of the colonial floras.

Alpinist

In 1858 Ball stood for County Limerick, but was defeated, and he then gave up politics and devoted himself to natural history. He was the first president of the Alpine Club (founded 1857), and it is for his work as an alpinist that he is chiefly remembered. His well-known Alpine Guide (London, 1863–1868) was the result of innumerable climbs and journeys and of careful observation recorded in a clear and often entertaining style. Among his accomplishments, he was the first to climb a major Dolomites peak (Monte Pelmo in 1857). He also travelled in Morocco (1871) and South America (1882), and recorded his observations in books which were recognised as having scientific value.

Personal life
His wife was Elisa Parolini, daughter of the Italian naturalist Alberto Parolini. Ball died in London in October 1889, aged 71.

Notes

References
 NEW EDITION

Gordon L. Herries Davies, 'Ball, John (1818–1889)', Oxford Dictionary of National Biography, Oxford University Press, 2004

External links 
 
 

1818 births
1889 deaths
Irish mountain climbers
Irish naturalists
Fellows of the Royal Society
Fellows of the Linnean Society of London
Politicians from County Dublin
Members of the Parliament of the United Kingdom for County Carlow constituencies (1801–1922)
Irish Liberal Party MPs
UK MPs 1852–1857
Presidents of the Alpine Club (UK)
Alumni of St Mary's College, Oscott